Comilla is a most popular city in Bangladesh.

Schools
 Comilla Zilla School
 Expert Technical Institute (Expert IT ) ,Cumilla
Police Line High School, Cumilla
Oxford International school and college, Debidwar
Burichong Ananda Pilot Govt. High School, Burichong
 Bakhrabad Gas Adarsha Bidhalaya, Comilla Adarsha Sadar Upazila
 Beltali High School, Comilla Sadar Dakshin Upazila
 Chandina Pilot High School, Chandina Upazila
 Chandpur Model Technical High School, Debidwar Upazila
 Comilla Cantonment High School
 Comilla High School
 Comilla Iswar Pathsala High School
 Comilla Modern High School
 Companigonj Badiul Alam High School, Muradnagar Upazila
 Debidwar Reazuddin Pilot High School, Debidwar Upazila
 Gangamandal Raj Institution, Debidwar Upazila
 Gazipur Khan High School and College, Titas Upazila
 Ghorashal Abdul Karim High School, Muradnagar Upazila
 Government Laboratory High School, Comilla
 Gouripur S. A. High School
 Gunabati Al Farabi High School, Chauddagram Upazila
 Gunabati Multilateral High School, Gunabati
 Gunabati Girls' High School, Chauddagram Upazila
 Haidarabad Hazi E. A. B. High School, Muradnagar Upazila
 Ibn Taimiya School and College, Comilla
 Ispahani Public High School and College, Comilla Cantonment
 Jamua High School
 Kangshanagar High School, Kangshanagar
 Khalil Pur High School, Debidwar Upazila
 Mathabhanga Bhairab High School, Homna Upazila
 Montoli High School and College, Nangalkot Upazila
 Mursheda Begum High School, Burichang Upazila
 Nawab Faizunnesa Government Girls' High School, Comilla
 Our Lady of Fatima Girls High School, Comilla
 Rajapur High School, Laksam Upazila
 Rose Garden International School, Comilla
 Shaila Rani Devi Mupl. Girls' High School, Comilla
 Suagonj T. A. High School and College, Comilla Sadar Dakshin Upazila
 Zobaeda Mumtaz Girls High school, Mohichile, Chandina, Comilla
Kutumbopur High School, Kutumbopur, Chandina, Comilla
ethnica school and college (English version)

See also

 Education in Bangladesh
 List of Educational Institutions in Comilla

 
Bangladesh education-related lists